Henderson Place Mall is a Chinese themed mall in the Town Centre area of  Coquitlam, British Columbia. It is located on Pinetree Way across from Coquitlam Centre and Lincoln Station of the Millennium Line. Opened in 1999, it has 245,000 square feet of retail space 

In 2019, it was offered for sale through CBRE Group.

References

Buildings and structures in Coquitlam
Shopping malls in Metro Vancouver
Shopping malls established in 1999
1999 establishments in British Columbia